Panagiotis Kynigopoulos (born 24 September 1996) is a Greek professional footballer who plays as a winger for Super League 2 club Kallithea.

References

External links

Panagiotis Kynigopoulos at pfc1891.gr

1996 births
Living people
Greek footballers
Greek expatriate footballers
Greece youth international footballers
Football League (Greece) players
Belgian Pro League players
Super League Greece players
Super League Greece 2 players
Sint-Truidense V.V. players
Iraklis Thessaloniki F.C. players
Panachaiki F.C. players
Association football wingers
People from Imathia
Footballers from Central Macedonia